The following is a list of notable deaths in July 1996.

Entries for each day are listed alphabetically by surname. A typical entry lists information in the following sequence:
 Name, age, country of citizenship at birth, subsequent country of citizenship (if applicable), reason for notability, cause of death (if known), and reference.

July 1996

1
William Thomas Cahill, 84, American politician.
Harold Greenberg, 66, Canadian film producer.
Margaux Hemingway, 42, American fashion model and actress, suicide.
Einar Hovdhaugen, 88, Norwegian politician.
Cláudio Kano, 30, Japanese Brazilian table tennis player, traffic collision.
Lawrence Low, 75, American sailor and Olympic champion.
Alfred Marks, 75, British actor and comedian.
Duke Maronic, 74, American gridiron football player.
Steve Tesich, 53, Serbian-American screenwriter (Breaking Away, The World According to Garp), Oscar winner (1980), heart attack.

2
Arvid Brodersen, 91, Norwegian sociologist
Ñuflo Chávez Ortiz, 72, Bolivian politician.
Hugh Davson, 86, English physiologist.
Mike Parobeck, 30, American comic book artist (Batman, Justice Society of America, El Diablo), diabetes.
Ingvar Pettersson, 70, Swedish race walker.
Hal Robson, 84, American racing driver.
Stefano Sibaldi, 91, Italian actor and voice actor.

3
Herb Baumeister, 49, American serial killer, suicide.
B. Gerald Cantor, 79, American investment banker.
Barry Crump, 61, New Zealand writer.
Sharon Hugueny, 52, American actress (The Young Lovers), cancer.
Pim Jacobs, 61, Dutch musician.
Raaj Kumar, 69, Indian actor.
Bernard Zehrfuss, 84, French architect.

4
Genevieve Blatt, 83, American politician
Magnhild Hagelia, 92, Norwegian politician.
Pierre Jaccoud, 90, Swiss lawyer.
James O. Plinton Jr., 81, U.S. Army Air Corps pilot and member of the Tuskegee Airmen.
Yagya Dutt Sharma, 73, Indian politician.

5
Fred Davis, 74, Canadian broadcaster, stroke.
Harold LeBruce Gilmore, 84, American politician.
Donald Adam Hartman, 66, Canadian politician.
Predrag Ostojić, 58, Yugoslav chess player, suicide.
Mohamed Seddik, 56, Egyptian football player.
Clyde Wiegand, 81, American physicist, prostate cancer.

6
Kutlu Adalı, 61, Turkish Cypriot journalist, poet, socio-political researcher, and peace advocate.
Kathy Ahern, 47, American golfer, breast cancer.
Armando Calvo, 70, Puerto Rican-born Spanish actor, heart failure.
Evgeni Rogov, 67, Soviet/Russian football player and manager.

7
David F. James, 90, American politician.
Michael McGoldrick, 31, Northern Irish taxi driver, murdered by the Loyalist Volunteer Force.
Vera Nedkova, 89, Bulgarian modernist painter.
Friedrich von Stülpnagel, 82, German track and field athlete and Olympic medalist.

8
J. W. Alexander, 80, American musician, record producer and entrepreneur.
Ernest Armstrong, 81, British politician.
Jim Baumer, 65, American baseball player, scout, and executive.
Albrecht, Duke of Bavaria, 91, German prince.
Jim Busby, 69, American Major League Baseball player and coach.
Richard Groschopp, 90, German film director and screenwriter.
Irene Prador, 84, Austrian-American actress and writer.
Luis Manuel Rodríguez, 59, Cuban boxer.

9
Melvin Mouron Belli, 88, American lawyer, author, and actor, pancreatic cancer.
Paul Bhagwandas, 45, Suriname battalion commander known as "the executioner of Fort Zeelandia", cancer.
Christopher Casson, 84, English-Irish actor.
Sergey Kuryokhin, 42, Russian composer, pianist, music director, film actor and writer, cancer.
Edward Purdy Ney, 75, American physicist.
Aurora Redondo, 96, Spanish actress.
David Colville Smith, 74, Rhodesian/Zimbabwean farmer and politician.

10
Paul King, 69, American producer and screenwriter.
Lou Lichtveld, 92, Surinamese politician, playwright, poet and resistance fighter.
Alex Manoogian, 95, Armenian-American industrial engineer, businessman, and philanthropist.
Fred Meyer, 76, American gridiron football player.
Jindřich Tintěra, 95, Czech gymnast and Olympian.

11
René Abadie, 60, French cyclist.
Louis Gottlieb, 72, American bassist and comic spokesman for music trio The Limeliters.
Bertil Lundell, 87, Swedish ice hockey, football and bandy player.
Ružica Meglaj-Rimac, 55, Yugoslav and Croatian basketball player.
Florrie Rodrigo, 102, Dutch dancer and choreographer

12
John Chancellor, 68, American journalist, stomach cancer.
Walter Hassan, 91, British automotive engineer.
Jonathan Melvoin, 34, American musician, heroin overdose.
Nazar Mohammad, 75, Pakistani cricket player.
Gottfried von Einem, 78, Austrian composer.
Clarence Wilkinson, 85, American politician.

13
Pandro S. Berman, 91, American film producer, heart failure.
Loda Halama, 84, Polish dancer and actress.
Bill Moe, 79, American ice hockey player.
Karen Simensen, 88, Norwegian figure skater.

14
Kenneth Bainbridge, 91, American physicist.
Jeff Krosnoff, 31, American race car driver, racing accident.
Karl Paryla, 90, Austrian theater actor and director.
Richard Ripley, 95, British athlete.
Kathrine Taylor, 92, American author.

15
William Dugan, 83, American rower and Olympian.
Dana Hill, 32, American actress (National Lampoon's European Vacation, Cross Creek, Goof Troop), stroke.
Sven Hörstadius, 98, Swedish embryologist.
Jan Krogh Jensen, 38, Norwegian-Danish outlaw biker, gangster, homicide.

16
Édouard Max-Robert, 91, French hurdler and Olympian.
John Panozzo, 47, American drummer, cirrhosis.
Iosif Prut, 95, Soviet/Russian playwright and screenwriter.
Adolf von Thadden, 75, German far-right politician.
Djamel Zitouni, 32, Algerian islamist terrorist group leader, killed.

17
Charles Bartley, 74, American scientist.
Chas Chandler, 57, English musician, record producer and manager, heart failure.
Geoffrey Jellicoe, 95, English architect, town planner, landscape architect and author.
John Joubert, 33, American serial killer, execution by electrocution.
Bratko Kreft, 91, Slovenian playwright, writer, literary historian and director.
Alan McGilvray, 86, Australian cricket player.
Paul Touvier, 81, French Nazi collaborator during World War II, prostate cancer.
Notable people killed in the crash of TWA Flight 800:
Michel Breistroff, 25, French ice hockey player.
Marcel Dadi, 44, Tunisian-French guitarist.
David Hogan, 47, American composer.
Jed Johnson, 47, American interior designer and director.
Pam Lychner, 37, American crime victims' rights advocate.
Rico Puhlmann, 62, German fashion photographer.

18
Stephen Donaldson, 49, American bisexual rights activist, and political activist, AIDS-related complications.
José Manuel Fuente, 50, Spanish road racing cyclist, pancreatitis.
Duke Christian Louis of Mecklenburg, 83, German noble.
Martin Summerfield, 79, American physicist and rocket scientist.

19
Raymond Burnett, 82, American football player and coach.
Berkeley Cole, 82, English Anglican priest and author.
Mervyn Cowie, 87, British conservationist.
Dan Lewandowski, 68, American baseball player.
E. T. Mensah, 77, Ghanaian musician.
Sverre Wilberg, 66, Norwegian actor.

20
Anna Chandy, 91, first female judge of India.
Eddie Jankowski, 83, American gridiron football player.
Colin Mitchell, 70, British Army soldier and politician.
Raphael Patai, 85, Hungarian-Jewish ethnographer, historian, orientalist and anthropologist.
František Plánička, 92, Czech football goalkeeper.
Arunachala Sreenivasan, 87, Indian food technologist and nutritional scientist .
Randy Stuart, 71, American actress, lung cancer.

21
Luana Anders, 58, American actress and screenwriter, breast cancer.
Rafael Cepeda, 86, Puerto Rican musician, myocardial infarction.
Herb Edelman, 62, American actor (The Golden Girls, St. Elsewhere, The Good Guys), pulmonary emphysema.
Inger Jacobsen, 72, Norwegian singer and actress, cancer.
Wolfe Morris, 71, English actor.
Walt Moryn, 70, American Major League Baseball outfielder.

22
Rob Collins, 33, English musician, car crash.
Tamara Danz, 43, German lead singer and lyricist of the rock group Silly, breast cancer.
Carl Goldenberg, 88, Canadian lawyer and senator.
Maggie Kalka, 83, Finnish sprint canoeist.
Vermont C. Royster, 82, American journalist and editor.

23
Herb Abrams, 41, American professional wrestling promoter, cocaine overdose.
Patriarch Parthenius III of Alexandria, 76, Greek Eastern Orthodox bishop.
Hamilton Fish IV, 70, American politician.
Jean Howell, 68, American actress.
Jessica Mitford, 78, English author and one of the Mitford sisters, lung cancer.
Jean Muir, 85, American actress and educator.
Red Munger, 77, American baseball player.
Frederick Osborne, 87, Australian politician and government minister.
Eric Ridder, 78, American sailor and Olympic champion.
Aliki Vougiouklaki, 62, Greek actress and theatrical producer, pancreatic cancer.

24
Virginia Christine, 76, American actress, cardiovascular disease.
Nacho Martínez, 44, Spanish actor, lung cancer.
Oreste Plath, 88, Chilean writer and folklorist.
Alphonso Roberts, 58, Vincentian political activist and cricket player.
Jock Wallace, 60, Scottish football player and manager, amyotrophic lateral sclerosis.

25
Blanca Canales, 90, Puerto Rican politician and independence advocate.
M. A. Manickavelu Naicker, 99, Indian politician.
Mikael Tariverdiev, 64, Soviet/Armenian composer.
Howard Vernon, 82, Swiss actor.

26
Jackie Cerone, 82, American mobster and boss of the Chicago Outfit.
Evelyn Danzig, 94, American songwriter and classical pianist.
Horacio Esteves, 55, Venezuelan sprinter.
Wesley P. Garcia, 82, Mexican-American physician, surgeon, and civil rights advocate.
Heriberto Herrera, 70, Paraguayan-Spanish football player.

27
Jane Drew, 85, English writer, architect and academic, cancer.
Yordan Filipov, 50, Bulgarian association football player.
Johann Hofstätter, 83, Austrian association football player and coach.
Takeyuki Kanda, 52, Japanese animator, traffic collision.
Al Rollins, 69, Canadian ice hockey player.

28
Bryant Haliday, 68, American actor.
Ivan V. Lalić, 65, Serbian writer and poet.
Roger Tory Peterson, 87, American naturalist, ornithologist and writer.
Michel Philippot, 71, French composer, mathematician, musicologist, and broadcaster.
Jaroslav Vejvoda, 76, Czech soccer player and coach.

29
Aruna Asaf Ali, 87, Indian independence activist.
Georgi Dakov, 28, Bulgarian high jumper, traffic collision.
Lauren Gale, 79, American basketball player.
Bill Green, 71, American jazz musician (reeds).
Roger Nelson, 64, American and Canadian football player.
Muhammad Osimi, 75, Soviet/Tajik philosopher, soldier, poet, and academic, killed in action.
Hilary Pritchard, 54, British actress.
Chick Reiser, 82, American basketball player and coach.
Marcel-Paul Schützenberger, 75, French mathematician and Doctor of Medicine.
Jason Thirsk, 28, American bass guitarist, suicide by gunshot.

30
Claudette Colbert, 92, American actress (It Happened One Night, Since You Went Away, Private Worlds), Oscar winner (1935), stroke.
Margaret Cousins, 91, American writer and editor.
Carlos Droguett, 83, Chilean writer.
Arihiro Hase, 31, Japanese voice actor and actor, suicide.
Anthony Peck, 49, American actor, cancer.
Magda Schneider, 87, German actress.
Constantin Teașcă, 73, Romanian football manager.

31
Petar Džadžić, 66, Serbian literary critic and academic.
Howie Goss, 61, American baseball player.
Ricardo Molinari, 98, Argentine writer.
Seagram, 27, American rapper, shot.
Neville Wadia, 84, Indian-British businessman.
Jay Lee Webb, 59, American singer, pancreatic cancer.

References 

1996-07
 07